Ringgold is an unincorporated community in Montague County, Texas, United States, with an estimated population of 100 people.

The town's major industry is cattle ranching.

Schools
Ringgold has one school, Ringgold Elementary School. Older students who live in Ringgold attend schools in nearby Stoneburg, where a consolidated school district (Gold-Burg ISD) has been established. Students may also opt to attend school in Nocona.

History
The area around Ringgold was settled in 1892, when a land owner began selling parcels in the area where the Rock Island Line railroad built a line. The town was first named Harrisonia after the land owner, Joe Harris, but he renamed it Ringgold after his wife's family. A post office was established the same year.

As an intersection of rail lines, Ringgold became a market town for the immediate area, and it reached its highest population of around 400 in the mid-1920s.

On January 1, 2006, about half of the town was destroyed by a wildfire that burned 32 homes. The event prompted much Dallas/Fort Worth area media coverage.

References

External links
 
 

Unincorporated communities in Montague County, Texas
Unincorporated communities in Texas